Goldville can refer to the following places in the United States:

 Goldville, a small town in Alabama
 Goldville, a ghost town in Nevada